Toshimitsu Izawa (born 2 March 1968) is a Japanese professional golfer. He is sometimes known outside Japan as Toshi Izawa.

Izawa was born in Kanagawa, attended Nihon Taiiku University, and turned professional in 1989.

Izawa's career on the Japan Golf Tour developed quite slowly. His first win came in 1995, and he did not make the top ten on the money list until 1999, when he was thirty one years old. He went on to top the money list in 2001 and 2003. In the first of those years he set a record of ¥217,934,583 in earnings which survived though the 2004 season, and his dominant form in Japan lifted him into the top twenty in the Official World Golf Ranking. He has 16 victories on the Japan Golf Tour and is eighth on the career money list (through 2013).

Izawa has only played a limited number of tournaments outside Japan, but in 2001 he finished tied fourth at the Masters Tournament, which is one of golf's four major championships, and tied for second at the PGA Tour's Nissan Open. In 2002, he won the WGC-World Cup for Japan in partnership with Shigeki Maruyama.

Professional wins (18)

Japan Golf Tour wins (16)

*Note: The 2000 JGTO TPC iiyama Cup was shortened to 54 holes due to weather.

Japan Golf Tour playoff record (2–1)

Other wins (1)

Japan PGA Senior Tour wins (1)
2019 Fukuoka Senior Open Golf Tournament

Playoff record
PGA Tour playoff record (0–1)

Results in major championships

CUT = missed the half-way cut
WD = withdrew
"T" = tied

Results in World Golf Championships

1Cancelled due to 9/11

QF, R16, R32, R64 = Round in which player lost in match play
"T" = Tied
NT = No tournament

Team appearances
World Cup (representing Japan): 2001, 2002 (winners)

See also
List of golfers with most Japan Golf Tour wins

References

External links

Japanese male golfers
Japan Golf Tour golfers
Sportspeople from Kanagawa Prefecture
1968 births
Living people